Heather Elizabeth Whelan (born 8 October 1977) is an Irish former cricketer who played as a right-arm medium-fast bowler. She appeared in 39 One Day Internationals and 4 Twenty20 Internationals for Ireland between 1997 and 2010, and captained the side between 2005 and 2010. Her siblings Roger and Jill both also represented Ireland in international cricket.

References

External links

1977 births
Living people
Irish women cricketers
Ireland women One Day International cricketers
Ireland women Twenty20 International cricketers
Cricketers from Dublin (city)
Irish women cricket captains